Máté Vass (born 17 October 1990) is a Hungarian football player who currently plays for THSE Szabadkikötő.

References

1990 births
Living people
Hungarian footballers
Association football midfielders
Ferencvárosi TC footballers
BFC Siófok players
Rákosmenti KSK players
Szigetszentmiklósi TK footballers
Budafoki LC footballers
Nemzeti Bajnokság II players